Maria Stanley, Baroness Stanley of Alderley (born Lady Maria Josepha Holroyd; 1771–1863) was a British letter writer and liberal advocate.

Life
Stanley was born in 1771 to Abigail (née Way) and John Baker Holroyd (later) 1st Earl of Sheffield. They lived at an estate called Sheffield Park in Sussex that her father had bought after inheriting a fortune from his uncle. Her father, a politician, became an Earl in 1781. In 1783 he was awarded another title in the Irish peerage with a special remainder that it could be inherited by his daughters. Her father's only son (at the time) had died aged five. She was precocious and she and her sister, Louise, would write and perform plays. The theme of many of these plays was a question; whether a daughter would be allowed to choose her own husband or whether it would be imposed by her parents.

When she was twelve her intelligence attracted the interest of Edward Gibbon who was a close friend of her father. Gibbon proposed that he should teach her over the next four years.

Stanley chose her own husband. She sorted through many likely groups and she decided to choose a man as well educated as herself. She married John Stanley, 7th Baronet and in time 1st Baron Stanley of Alderley, in 1796. Her husband was known as an Icelandic explorer. They went to live at Alderley Park in Cheshire. The Stanley family had lived there for around two hundred years, but the hall had been damaged by fire in 1779. The 7th Baronet and Baroness had commissioned a new hall to be constructed in 1818 in the south of the estate on a site then occupied by Park House. They lived there for fifty years and there were 11 children of the marriage, with sons who were twins and seven daughters surviving to become adults. The sons were Edward John (1802–1869), the elder twin who inherited the title, and William Owen Stanley  (1802–1884), a Liberal Party politician.

Of the seven daughters who survived:

Lucy Anne married a naval officer named Marcus Theodore Hare and they had three children.
Isabella Louisa (1801–1839) married William Parry, and was mother of Edward Parry.
Matilda Abigail married Henry John Adeane.

Death and legacy
Stanley died in Shiplake in 1863. In 1896, her early letters were published as "Girlhood of Maria Josepha Holroyd (Lady Stanley of Alderley)".

References

1771 births
1863 deaths
British reporters and correspondents
People from Shiplake